Deer Park is an unincorporated community in Boone County, in the U.S. state of Missouri. It is located south of Columbia on U.S. Route 63.

History
A post office called Deer Park was established in 1886, and remained in operation until 1907. The community was named for the abundance of deer in a nature reserve park near the original town site. It is near the present day Three Creeks Conservation Area.

References

Unincorporated communities in Boone County, Missouri
Unincorporated communities in Missouri